Angelo Palmas (21 December 1914 – 9 June 2003) was an Italian prelate of the Catholic Church who worked in the diplomatic service of the Holy See.

Biography
Palmas was born in Villanova Monteleone, Italy, on 21 December 1914. He was ordained a priest on 5 August 1938.

To prepare for a diplomatic career he entered the Pontifical Ecclesiastical Academy in 1945.

On 17 June 1964, Pope Paul VI named him a titular archbishop and Apostolic Delegate to Vietnam and Cambodia. He received his episcopal consecration from Pope Paul on 28 June 1964.

On 19 April 1969, Pope Paul appointed him Apostolic Nuncio to Colombia.

On 3 September 1975, Pope Paul named him Apostolic Pro-Nuncio to Canada. 

He retired when replaced in that post in March 1990.

Angelon Palmas died on 9 June 2003.

Notes

References

External links
Catholic Hierarchy: Archbishop Angelo Palmas 

1914 births
2003 deaths
Pontifical Ecclesiastical Academy alumni
Apostolic Nuncios to Colombia
Apostolic Nuncios to Canada
People from the Province of Sassari